Hum is a mountain in Croatia, an isolated cone-shaped mountain with the height of , located north of Plaški.

References

Mountains of Croatia
Landforms of Karlovac County